Romolo Broglio (1655 - 1736) was an Italian architect and cleric living and active in the province of Macerata, region of the Marche, Italy. 

He was born in Treia. He is described as a mathematician and scholar. He designed among others, the church of San Filippo in Recanati and the octagonal church of Santa Chiara in Treia.

References

1655 births
1736 deaths
People from the Province of Macerata
17th-century Italian architects
18th-century Italian architects